Way Down Here is the fourth album by Canadian alternative country group Cuff the Duke, released September 8, 2009 on Noble Recordings in Canada and Ernest Jenning Record Co. in the US.

Track listing
 "You Were Right"
 "Follow Me"
 "It's All a Blur"
 "The Words You Ignore"
 "Promises"
 "Listen to Your Heart"
 "Rockin' Chair"
 "Like the Morning"
 "Another Day in Purgatory"
 "Need You"
 "Farley the Dog"

References

2009 albums
Cuff the Duke albums